Prospect Creek is a small creek in the Kimberley region in the state of Western Australia. It feeds into the Armanda River near Halls Creek.
The headwaters of the creek rise below the Duffer range and flow in a northerly direction, almost parallel with the Great Northern Highway until discharging into the Armanda River, of which it is a tributary.

References 

Rivers of the Kimberley region of Western Australia